The following is a list of programs broadcast by Heart of Asia Channel, a Philippine free-to-air television channel owned by GMA Network Inc.

Current original programs
Note: Titles are listed in alphabetical order followed by the year of debut in parentheses.

Chinese
 Douluo Continent 
 God of Lost Fantasy

Singaporean
 Hello From The Other Side

South Korean
 Love Alert 
 Princess Hours (Korean version) 
 Queen and I 
 Scarlet Heart 
 Secret Garden 
 VIP

Taiwanese
 Prince of Wolf

Current syndicated programs
Note: Titles are listed in alphabetical order followed by the year of debut in parentheses.

News
 Balitanghali

Local drama
 Munting Heredera 
 Rainbow Prince 
 The Half Sisters

Variety
 All-Out Sundays

Film presentation
 Action Flicks 
 Asian Cinemix 
 Feel na Films 
 Strictly Pinoy

Infomercial
 EZ Shop Asia

Previous programs
Note: Titles are listed in alphabetical order followed by the year of debut in parentheses.

Original programs
Chinese
 Fighter of Destiny 
 Fire of Eternal Love 
 God of Lost Fantasy 
 Legend of Fuyao 
 Love Actually 
 Princess Weiyoung 
 Rakshasa Street 
 Starry Night, Starry Sea 
 The Fox Fairy 
 The Love Knot 
 When a Snail Falls in Love 

Indian
 Aladdin: You Would've Heard the Name 

Japanese
 Chibi Maruko-chan 
 Gokusen 
 Moribito: Final 

Latin American
 La Doña 
 The Formula 

Singaporean
 When Duty Calls 

South Korean
 Angel's Last Mission 
 Are You Human? 
 Backstreet Rookie 
 Boys Over Flowers 
 Doctor John 
 Dong Yi 
 Emperor: Ruler of the Mask 
 Extraordinary You 
 Fates and Furies 
 Fight for My Way 
 Her Private Life 
 Hit the Top 
 Innocent Defendant 
 Into the World Again 
 Lie After Lie 
 Like a Fairytale  
 Love Alert 
 Love in Trouble   
 Man X Man 
 Marrying My Daughter Twice 
 Misty 
 Mr. Queen 
 My Absolute Boyfriend 
 My Daughter, Geum Sa-weol 
 My Love from the Star 
 Oh My Baby 
 Oh My Ghost 
 Playful Kiss 
 Queen of Mystery 
 Scarlet Heart 
 Scripting Your Destiny 
 Secret Garden 
 Sky Castle 
 Stairway to Heaven 
 Strong Girl Bong-soon 
 Tale of the Nine Tailed 
 The Big One 
 The Good Manager 
 The Heirs 
 The Last Empress 
 The Penthouse 
 The Penthouse 2 
 The Penthouse 3 
 The Romantic Doctor 2 
 VIP 
 When the Weather Is Fine 
 Where Stars Land 
 While You Were Sleeping 
 Whisper 
 Woman of Dignity 

Taiwanese
 Prince of Wolf 

Thai
 Art of the Spirit 
 Bad Genius: The Series 
 Bangkok Love Stories Presents: Charming Girl 
 Finding Love 
 Game of Affection 
 Hidden Love 
 In Time With You 
 Love Beyond Time 
 Madam Pushy and I 
 Mr. Merman 
 My Love From Another Star 
 Nakee 
 Princess Hours (Thai version) 
 Pure Intention 
 Rising Sun 
 Rising Sun 2 
 Secret Love Online 
 Secret Seven 
 Switch 
 The Blooming Treasure 
 The Crown Princess 
 The Desire 
 The Frog Prince 
 The Gifted 
 The Gifted: Graduation 
 The Sand Princess 
 Two Spirits' Love 
 U-Prince Series 
 Ugly Duckling Series 
 Waves of Life 
 Wicked Angel 
 You're My Destiny 

Turkish
 Price of Passion 
 Taste of Love 

Variety
 Mr. Player

Syndicated programs
Local drama
 Adarna 
 Amaya 
 Anna Karenina 
 Because of You 
 Ben X Jim 
 Boys' Lockdown 
 Boys' Lockdown: Fan Service 
 Buena Familia 
 Dading 
 Dwarfina 
 Gameboys 
 Hiram na Alaala 
 Ika-6 na Utos 
 Ikaw Lang ang Mamahalin 
 Kakambal ni Eliana 
 Legacy 
 Little Nanay 
 Pyra: Babaeng Apoy 
 Rhodora X 
 Super Twins 
 T.G.I.S. 
 Temptation of Wife 
 The Borrowed Wife

References

Heart of Asia Channel
Heart of Asia Channel